A referendum on joining the European Union was held in Norway on 27 and 28 November 1994. After a long period of heated debate, the "no" side won with 52.2 per cent of the vote, on a turnout of 88.6 per cent. Membership of what was then the European Community had previously been rejected in a 1972 referendum, and by French veto in 1962.

Campaign
The "No" campaign was led by Anne Enger Lahnstein, leader of the Centre Party. The main themes of the "No" campaign were loss of sovereignty if Norway should join the Union, as well as the fundamental differences in economic structure between Norway and the EU, as Norway has an economy based heavily on natural resources (especially oil and fish), in contrast to the EU's more industrial economy.

Prime Minister Gro Harlem Brundtland led the "Yes" campaign. Her party, the Labour Party, was divided on the question of Norwegian membership of the Union. She refused to threaten to resign if the referendum failed to result in a "Yes" vote, on the grounds that more serious divisions could have arisen in the Labour Party. The main arguments of the "Yes" side were that as a European country, Norway belonged in the European Union, and that Norway's economy would benefit from membership.

According to John Erik Fossum, a political science professor at ARENA, Centre for European Studies, University of Oslo, "the fact that Norway had already signed the EEA agreement made it easier for people to vote no because they knew that Norway had assured EU market access."

Results

Countrywide

By constituency

See also
Norway–European Union relations

References

External links
The European Movement in Norway
No to the EU - Norwegian eurosceptics
Norway. EU Referendum 1994, Electoral Geography 2.0 website

Referendums in Norway
Norway
1994 in Norway
Referendums related to European Union accession
1994 in international relations
1994 in the European Union
Norway–European Union relations
November 1994 events in Europe